Back to Black is the second and final studio album by English singer and songwriter Amy Winehouse, released on 27 October 2006 by Island Records. Winehouse predominantly based the album on her tumultuous relationship with then-ex-boyfriend and future husband Blake Fielder-Civil, who temporarily left her to pursue his previous ex-girlfriend. Their short-lived separation spurred her to create an album that explores themes of guilt, grief, infidelity, heartbreak and trauma in a relationship.

Influenced by the pop and soul music of 1960s girl groups, Winehouse collaborated with producers Salaam Remi and Mark Ronson, along with Sharon Jones' band The Dap-Kings, to assist her on capturing the sounds from that period while blending them with contemporary R&B and neo-soul music. Between 2005 and 2006, she recorded the album's songs with Remi at Instrumental Zoo Studios in Miami and then with Ronson and the Dap-Kings at Chung King Studios and Daptone Records in New York. Tom Elmhirst mixed the album at Metropolis Studios in London.

Back to Black was acclaimed by music critics, who praised Winehouse's songwriting and emotive singing style as well as Remi and Ronson's production. The album spawned five singles: "Rehab", "You Know I'm No Good", "Back to Black", "Tears Dry on Their Own" and "Love Is a Losing Game". It has also been cited as being a key influence to the widespread popularity of British soul throughout the late 2000s, paving the musical landscape for artists such as Adele, Duffy, and Estelle.

At the 2008 Grammy Awards, Back to Black won Best Pop Vocal Album and was also nominated for Album of the Year. At the same ceremony, Winehouse won four additional awards, tying her with five other artists as the second-most awarded female in a single ceremony. The album was also nominated at the 2007 Brit Awards for MasterCard British Album and was shortlisted for the 2007 Mercury Prize. Back to Black sold 3.58 million copies in the UK alone, becoming the UK's second best-selling album of the 21st century so far. The album has sold over 16 million copies worldwide.

A deluxe edition of Back to Black was released in November 2007, containing a bonus disc of B-sides and live tracks. Winehouse's debut DVD I Told You I Was Trouble: Live in London, released that same month, includes a live set recorded at Shepherd's Bush Empire in London and a 50-minute documentary detailing the singer's career over the previous four years. In 2020, Back to Black was ranked at number 33 on Rolling Stone's list of the "500 Greatest Albums of All Time".

Background
After signing with Island Records in 2002, Winehouse released her debut album, Frank, on 20 October 2003. She dedicated the album to her ex-boyfriend, Chris Taylor, as she gradually lost interest in him. Produced mainly by Salaam Remi, many songs were influenced by jazz, and apart from two cover versions, every song was co-written by Winehouse. The album received positive reviews, with compliments over the "cool, critical gaze" in its lyrics, while her vocals drew comparisons to Sarah Vaughan, Macy Gray and others.
The album reached number 13 on the UK Albums Chart at the time of its release, and has been certified triple Platinum by the British Phonographic Industry (BPI). In 2004, Winehouse was nominated for British Female Solo Artist and British Urban Act at the Brit Awards, while Frank made the shortlist for the Mercury Prize. That same year, the album's first single, "Stronger Than Me", earned Winehouse and Remi an Ivor Novello Award for Best Contemporary Song. In a 2004 interview with The Observer, Winehouse expressed dissatisfaction with the album, stating that "some things on [the] album [made her] go to a little place that's fucking bitter". She further notes that the marketing was "fucked", the promotion was "terrible", and everything was "a shambles".

In 2003, Winehouse dated Blake Fielder-Civil, who was an assistant on music video sets. Around the same time, she rediscovered the 1960s music she loved as a girl, stating in a 2007 Rolling Stone interview: "When I fell in love with Blake, there was Sixties music around us a lot." In 2005, the couple spent a lot of time in a local Camden bar, and during their time there, Winehouse would listen to blues, '60s girl groups, and Motown artists, explaining that "it was [her] local" and "spent a lot of time there [...] playing pool and listening to jukebox music." The music heard in the bar appealed to Winehouse when she was writing songs for her second album.

Around the same year, she went through a period of drinking, heavy drug use, and weight loss. People who saw her during the end of that year and early 2006 reported a rebound that coincided with the writing of Back to Black. Her family believes that the mid-2006 death of her grandmother, who was a stabilising influence, set her off into addiction. Fielder-Civil then left Winehouse to revert to his previous girlfriend. During their break, she would write the bulk of the album on the state of her "relationship at the time with Blake [Fielder-Civil]" through themes of "grief, guilt, and heartache". Winehouse dated chef-musician Alex Clare briefly in 2006, and would later return to and marry Fielder-Civil in the following year.

Recording and production

Most of the songs on Back to Black were solely written by Winehouse, as her primary focus of the album's sound shifted more towards the style of the girl groups from the 1950s and 1960s. Winehouse worked with New York singer Sharon Jones's longtime band, the Dap-Kings, to back her up in the studio and on tour. Her father, Mitch Winehouse, relates in his memoir, Amy, My Daughter, how fascinating watching her process was, especially with witnessing her perfectionism in the studio. She would also put out what she had sung on a CD and play it in his taxi outside to know how most people would hear her music.

In 2005, Winehouse returned to Miami (as she went there previously to produce her debut album) to record five songs at Salaam Remi's Instrumental Zoo Studios: "Tears Dry on Their Own", "Some Unholy War", "Me & Mr Jones", "Just Friends", and "Addicted". The recording process of Remi's album portion was "intimate", consisting of Winehouse singing while on guitar and Remi adding the other instruments played mostly by himself (chiefly played the piano and the main/bass guitars on the album), or by instrumentalist Vincent Henry (primarily played the saxophone, the flute, and the clarinet).
Winehouse and producer Mark Ronson both shared a publishing company, which encouraged a meeting between the two. They conversed in March 2006 in Ronson's New York studio that he used to have. They worked on six tracks together: "Rehab", "Back to Black", "You Know I'm No Good", "Love Is a Losing Game", "Wake Up Alone", and "He Can Only Hold Her". Ronson said in a 2010 interview with The Guardian that he liked working with Winehouse because she was blunt when she did not like his work. She in turn thought that when they first met, he was a sound engineer and that she was expecting an "older man with a beard".

Ronson wrote "Back to Black" the night after he met Winehouse, explaining in a 2010 Mojo interview: "I just thought, 'Let's talk about music, see what she likes.' She said she liked to go out to bars and clubs and play snooker with her boyfriend and listen to the Shangri-Las. So she played me some of those records ... I told her that I had nothing to play her right now but if she [lets] me work on something overnight she could come back tomorrow. So I came up with this little piano riff, which became the verse chords to 'Back to Black.' Behind it I just put a kick drum and a tambourine and tons of reverb."

Mark Ronson later recalled the Back to Black recording sessions in a 2015 The FADER interview:
"Amy was so serious about her words. Working on “Back to Black,” when she first sang the chorus, she said, We only said goodbye in words/ I died a hundred times. My producer instinct went off and I said, “Hey, sorry, it’s got to rhyme. That’s weird. Can you fix that?” And she just looked at me like I was crazy, like, “Why would I fix that? That’s what came out.” They’re some of the most unlikely lyrics you could ever imagine on a massive pop single."

Winehouse's father later recalled the formulation of "Rehab" in his memoir: "One day [Ronson and Winehouse] decided to take a quick stroll around the neighborhood because Amy wanted to buy [her then-boyfriend] Alex Clare a present ... on the way back Amy began telling Mark about being with Blake [Fielder-Civil, her ex], then not being with Blake and being with Alex instead. She told him about the time at my house after she'd been in hospital when everyone had been going on at her about her drinking: 'You know they tried to make me go to rehab, and I told them, no, no, no.' 'That's quite gimmicky,' Mark replied. 'It sounds hooky. You should go back to the studio and we should turn that into a song.'" The majority of the songs produced by Ronson were completed at Daptone Records—along with the instrumental help of The Dap-Kings—in Brooklyn, New York. Three of the horn players from the group played a baritone saxophone, a tenor saxophone, and a trumpet. Ronson recorded the trio to create the "'60s-sounding metallics" on the album. The drums, piano, guitar, and bass were all done together in one room, with the drums being recorded with one microphone. There was also much spill between the instruments. Additional production of the album was located at Chung King and Allido Studios in New York City, and at Metropolis Records in London. In the Allido studio, Ronson used synthesisers and vintage keyboards to display the sound landscape for the album, including the Wurlitzer electric piano. In May of that year, Winehouse's demo tracks such as "You Know I'm No Good" and "Rehab" appeared on Mark Ronson's New York radio show on East Village Radio. These were some of the first new songs played on the radio after the release of "Pumps" and both were slated to appear on her second album. The 11-track album, completed in five months, was produced entirely by Remi and Ronson, with the production credits being split between them.

Post-production
Tom Elmhirst, who mixed the single "You Know I'm No Good", was enlisted to help with the mixing of the album at Metropolis Records. He first received Ronson's original mix, which he described as being "radical in terms of panning, kind of Beatlesque". He continued, "The drums, for instance, were all panned to one side". He attempted to mix "Love Is a Losing Game" in the same manner he did with "Rehab", but felt it was not right to do so. Elmhirst mixed "Rehab", but when he first received the multitrack of the song, the track amount was minimal. Therefore, Ronson went to London to record strings, brass and percussion in one of Metropolis' tracking rooms.
After these instruments were added, the song had garnered a "retro, '60s soul, R&B" feel to it. Elmhirst added a contemporary sound to the song as well, while Ronson wanted to keep the mix sparse and not overproduced. The album was mastered by Stuart Hawkes at Metropolis.

Music and lyrics

Composition and sound 

Back to Black has been cited to have musical stylings of contemporary R&B, neo soul, reggae, classic R&B, and 1960s "pop and soul". According to AllMusic's John Bush, Back to Black finds Winehouse "deserting jazz and wholly embracing contemporary R&B". David Mead of Paste also viewed it as a departure from Frank and said that it sets her singing to Salaam Remi and Mark Ronson's "synthetic Motown-style backdrop". Meanwhile, Ann Powers from NPR Music characterised Back to Black as "a full embrace of classic rhythm and blues." Music journalist Chuck Eddy credits Ronson and Remi's production for resembling Phil Spector's Wall of Sound technique and surrounding Winehouse with brass and string sections, harp, and the Wurlitzer. PopMatters writer Christian John Wikane said that its "sensibilities of 1960s pop and soul" are contradicted by Winehouse's "blunt" lyrics and felt that "this particular marriage of words and music mirrors the bittersweet dichotomy that sometimes frames real relationships". The staff of The A.V. Club emphasized on "the record's status as the pinnacle of the Brit neo-soul wave it ushered in".

Songs 1–6 

The album's first song and single, "Rehab", is an upbeat, contemporary, and autobiographical song about Winehouse's past refusal to attend an alcohol rehabilitation centre after a conversation she had with her father, Mitch Winehouse. Previously, her management team prodded her to go to one.
The song also contains "spring reverbs" on the lead vocals and drums to obtain a "retro feel", live "handclaps", timpanis, bells, and "slight vintage effects" on the piano and bass. Winehouse mentions "Ray" and "Mr. Hathaway", in reference to Ray Charles and Donny Hathaway. However, for some time during live performances, she replaced "Ray" with "Blake", referring to her ex-husband, Blake Fielder-Civil, who served time in prison for charges relating to grievous bodily harm.

"You Know I'm No Good" is an uptempo song about Winehouse cheating on a "good man that loves her", and therefore cheating herself out of a healthy relationship. The lyrics also entail Winehouse as being "helpless" while trying to understand and resist her own self-destructive compulsions.

In the jazz and reggae-influenced "Me and Mr Jones" song, Winehouse sings about accepting that she never made it to a Slick Rick concert, but yet refuses to skip a Nas show as they were both close friends (Nas' last name is Jones). The song's title plays off the 1972 "Me and Mrs. Jones" by Billy Paul. In a 2011 XXL interview, Nas recollects: "I don't really remember if Salaam, who was really close to her [Winehouse], who introduced us, if he told me about it ["Mr Jones" being based on Nas] or not [...] But, I heard a lot about it before I even heard the song." Winehouse cursed about the relationship between her and Nas in the song's first chorus ("What kind of fuckery is this?" / "You made me miss the Slick Rick gig") and in later ones as well. In a Genius commentary, Island Records president Darcus Beese added that the original track was titled "Fuckery" from both Remi and Winehouse. He then continues, "I remember saying to Amy and Salaam, "You can't call this song 'Fuckery' [...] Salaam was more of the grown up of the two but Amy was like, 'Well, why can't I?' [...] That's why I always say, you have to give everything you're thinking and give people something that's exciting."

The fourth song on the album, "Just Friends", is about "[a woman] trying to pull away from an illicit affair", with lyrics indicating, "The guilt will kill you if she don't first". It is a "ska-soul" song with a "pulsing reggae groove" throughout the track. Jon Pareles of The New York Times elaborates that Winehouse makes songs such as "Just Friends" into "games of tone and phrasing [...] withholding a line and then breezing through it, stretching out a note over [her backing band]'s steady beat".

The title track "Back to Black" explores elements of old-school soul music. The song's sound and beat have been described as similar to vintage girl groups from the 1960s. Its production was noted for its Wall of Sound. Winehouse expresses feelings of hurt and bitterness for a boyfriend who has left her; however, throughout the lyrics she "remains strong" exemplified in the opening lines, "He left no time to regret, Kept his  wet, With his same old safe bet, Me and my head high, And my tears dry, Get on without my guy". The song was inspired by her relationship with Fielder-Civil, who had left Winehouse for an ex-girlfriend. The breakup left her going to "black", which to the listener may appear to refer to drinking and depression.  "Black" has sometimes been considered as a reference to heroin, but this is inaccurate as Winehouse's heroin use did not begin until after her marriage to Blake Fielder-Civil (mid 2007), as confirmed in the Asif Kapadia documentary. The song's lyrical content consists of a sad goodbye to a relationship with the lyrics being frank. John Murphy of musicOMH compared the song's introduction to the Martha and the Vandellas song "Jimmy Mack", adding that it continues to a "much darker place".

"Love Is a Losing Game" is a sentimental ballad that invokes Winehouse's chosen metaphor as a pastime that could be "addictive and destructive". Alexis Petridis of The Guardian further explains, "Over a solitary electric guitar and subtle drums, [Winehouse's] voice takes centre stage to [set] out her resigned viewpoint that, as with gambling, you can only love for so long before ending up the loser".

Songs 7–11 

The song "Tears Dry on Their Own" samples the main chord progression from Marvin Gaye and Tammi Terrell's 1967 song "Ain't No Mountain High Enough". Remi stated that he thought the album needed something "up-tempo" and suggested to Winehouse that she procure a "slower, sadder conception" of the song. Laura Barton of The Guardian explicated the track as Winehouse giving herself a stern "talking-to" with lyrics such as, "I cannot play myself again, I should be my own best friend" and "Not fuck myself in the head with stupid men".

The HelloBeautiful staff views "Wake Up Alone", written by Winehouse and Paul O'Duffy, as another sentimental ballad that "chronicles [the] time right after a breakup [and] when you're trying not to think of the person by keeping busy." They add, "[B]ut when night time comes, so do [the] thoughts of said person." Winehouse spent a month in O'Duffy's North London studio working on tracks of the album, and "Wake Up Alone" was the first song recorded during the sessions and the only tune that made it onto the album. A "one-take" demo of the song recorded in March 2006 by O'Duffy later appeared on Winehouse's posthumous album, Lioness: Hidden Treasures.

Nick Shymansky, Winehouse's first manager, revealed that the inspiration of "Some Unholy War", a mid-tempo soul song, came into fruition after Winehouse heard a radio broadcast on the War in Afghanistan. As she heard the term "holy war", a war being primarily caused or justified by differences in religion, Winehouse immediately thought of an idea to spin the religious conflict into her own personal issues with Fielder-Civil. The idea is further bolstered with the song's opening lines, "If my man was fighting some unholy war, I would be behind him". Usually in live performances, she would start with the slower version of the song before proceeding into a more uptempo version.

"He Can Only Hold Her" interpolates "(My Girl) She's a Fox" by brothers Robert and Richard Poindexter. Joshua Klein of Pitchfork describes Winehouse in the song as "an objective observer, [and] able to see her personal issues for what they are". The chorus goes, "So he tries to pacify her, 'cause what's inside her never dies". Klein assumes that from "this new vantage [,] Winehouse has moved on". John Harrison, the original demo producer of "He Can Only Hold Her", explained at a BIMM London masterclass that he was "introduced to '(My Girl) She's a Fox' by his sister". He then played the song for Winehouse and, when she expressed interest, made a backing track for her. Harrison was not originally given a writing credit on Back to Black, so he sued Winehouse for copyright infringement. They had a settlement over the song, and eventually, his name was added to the track. The initial Back to Black liner notes only said: "Original demo produced by P*Nut [John Harrison's nickname]."

"Addicted", a bonus track included on the expanded versions of Back to Black, pertains to Winehouse's experiences with marijuana. "I used to smoke a lot of weed", the singer told Rolling Stone in 2007. "I suppose if you have an addictive personality [,] then you go from one poison to the other."

Release and promotion

Back to Black was released on 27 October 2006. A deluxe edition of Back to Black was released in mainland Europe in November 2007 and in the United Kingdom on 3 December 2007. The reissue features the original studio album remastered as well as a bonus disc containing various B-sides and live tracks, including Winehouse's solo rendition of the single "Valerie" on BBC Radio 1's Live Lounge; the song was originally available in studio form on Ronson's Version album. Winehouse's debut DVD I Told You I Was Trouble: Live in London was released in the UK on 5 November and in the US on 13 November. It includes a live set recorded at London's Shepherd's Bush Empire and a 50-minute documentary chronicling the singer's career over the previous four years.

The first single released from the album on 23 October 2006 was "Rehab". On 22 October 2006, based solely on download sales, it entered the UK Singles Chart at number 19, and when the physical single was released the following week, it climbed to number seven. Following a performance of "Rehab" at the 2007 MTV Movie Awards on 3 June 2007, the song rose to number 10 on the US Billboard Hot 100 for the week of 23 June, peaking at number nine the following week.

"You Know I'm No Good" was released on 8 January 2007 as the album's second single, reaching number 18 on the UK Singles Chart. Back to Black was released in the United States in March 2007, with a remix of "You Know I'm No Good" featuring rap vocals by Ghostface Killah as its lead single. A third UK single, "Back to Black", was released on 30 April 2007. Having previously peaked at number 25 on the UK chart, the track climbed to number eight in late July 2011, following Winehouse's death. Two further singles were released from the album: "Tears Dry on Their Own" was released on 13 August 2007, and peaked at number 16 in the UK, while "Love Is a Losing Game", released on 10 December 2007, reached number 33.

Touring
 
Winehouse promoted the release of Back to Black with headline performances in late 2006, including a Little Noise Sessions charity concert at the Union Chapel in Islington, London. On 31 December 2006, Winehouse appeared on Jools Holland's Annual Hootenanny and performed a cover of Marvin Gaye's "I Heard It Through the Grapevine" along with Paul Weller and Holland's Rhythm and Blues Orchestra. She also performed Toots and the Maytals' "Monkey Man". At his request, actor Bruce Willis introduced Winehouse before her performance of "Rehab" at the 2007 MTV Movie Awards in Universal City, California, on 3 June 2007. During the summer of 2007, she performed at various festivals, including Glastonbury Festival, Lollapalooza in Chicago, Belgium's Rock Werchter, and Virgin Festival in Baltimore.
 
In November 2007, the opening night of a 17-date tour was marred by booing and walkouts at the National Indoor Arena in Birmingham. A critic for the Birmingham Mail said it was "one of the saddest nights of my life [...] I saw a supremely talented artist reduced to tears, stumbling around the stage and, unforgivably, swearing at the audience." Other concerts ended similarly, with, for example, fans at her Hammersmith Apollo performance saying that she "looked highly intoxicated throughout", until she announced on 27 November 2007 that her performances and public appearances were cancelled for the remainder of the year, citing her doctor's advice to take a complete rest. A statement issued by concert promoter Live Nation blamed "the rigours involved in touring and the intense emotional strain that Amy has been under in recent weeks" for the decision. Mitch Winehouse wrote about her nervousness before public performances in his 2012 book, Amy, My Daughter.

Critical reception

Back to Black received widespread acclaim from critics. At Metacritic, which assigns a normalised rating out of 100 to reviews from mainstream publications, the album received an average score of 81, based on 26 reviews. AllMusic writer John Bush lauded Winehouse's musical transition from her debut record: "All the best parts of her musical character emerge intact, and actually, are all the better for the transformation from jazz vocalist to soul siren." Dorian Lynskey of The Guardian called Back to Black "a 21st-century soul classic". Sal Cinquemani of Slant Magazine said that Winehouse and her producers are "expert mood-setters or crafty reconstructionists". The New Yorkers Sasha Frere-Jones praised Winehouse's "mush-mouthed approach [on the album]". Nathan Rabin, writing in The A.V. Club, was impressed by "the incongruity between Winehouse's trifling lyrical concerns and Back To Blacks wall-of-sound richness". Entertainment Weeklys Will Hermes felt that her "smartass" lyrics "raise [the album] into the realm of true, of-the-minute originality". Douglas Wolk, writing for Blender, said that the album "sounds fantastic—partly because the production nails sample-ready '60s soul right down to the drum sound [...] Winehouse is one hell of an impressive singer, especially when she's not copping other people's phrasing".

Some reviewers were more critical of the album. In a mixed review, Rolling Stones Christian Hoard stated: "The tunes don't always hold up. But the best ones are impossible to dislike." Robert Christgau gave it an "honorable mention" in his consumer guide for MSN Music, citing "You Know I'm No Good" and "Rehab" as highlights and writing, "Pray her marriage lasts—she's observant, and it would broaden her perspective". Pitchfork critic Joshua Klein criticised Winehouse's "defensive", subjective lyrics concerning relationships, but added that "Winehouse has been blessed by a brassy voice that can transform even mundane sentiments into powerful statements".

Accolades
Back to Black was named one of the 10 best albums of 2006 and 2007 by several publications on their year-end albums lists, including Time (number one), Entertainment Weekly (number two), Billboard (number three), The New York Times (number three), The Austin Chronicle (number four), Slant Magazine (number four), and Blender (number eight). The album was placed at number 40 on Rolling Stones list of The Top 50 Albums of 2007. Entertainment Weekly critic Chris Willman named Back to Black the second best album of 2007, commenting that "Black will hold up as one of the great breakthrough CDs of our time." He adds, "In the end, the singer's real-life heartache over her incarcerated spouse proves what's obvious from the grooves: When this lady sings about love, she means every word." Rolling Stones list of the 100 Best Albums of the 2000s ranked the album number 20.

At the 2007 Brit Awards, Winehouse won British Female Solo Artist, and Back to Black was nominated for MasterCard British Album. In July 2007, the album was shortlisted for the 2007 Mercury Prize, but lost out to Klaxons' Myths of the Near Future. This was the second time that Winehouse was nominated for the Mercury Prize; her debut album Frank was shortlisted in 2004. Back to Black won numerous awards at the 50th Annual Grammy Awards on 10 February 2008, including Record of the Year and Song of the Year for "Rehab"; while the album received nominations for Album of the Year and Best Pop Vocal Album, winning the latter. Winehouse herself, for the album, was presented the Grammy for Best New Artist, while Ronson earned the 2008 Grammy Award for Producer of the Year, Non-Classical.

Commercial performance
Back to Black debuted at number three on the UK Albums Chart on 5 November 2006 with first-week sales of 43,021 copies. The album reached number one for the first time during the week ending 20 January 2007, its 11th week on the chart, selling over 35,500 copies. The following week, it remained at number one with nearly 48,000 copies sold. Five weeks later, it returned for a third week atop the UK chart, selling 47,000 copies. Back to Black was the best-selling album of 2007 in the UK, having sold 1.85 million copies. The BPI certified the album 13-times Platinum on 30 March 2018, and by October 2018, it had sold 3.93 million copies, making it the UK's second best-selling album of the 21st century so far, as well as the 12th best-selling album in the UK of all time.

Back to Black debuted at number seven on the Billboard 200 in the United States with first-week sales of 51,000 copies, becoming the highest debut entry for an album by a British female solo artist at the time—a record that would be broken by Joss Stone's Introducing Joss Stone, which debuted at number two on the Billboard 200 the following week. Following Winehouse's multiple wins at the 50th Annual Grammy Awards, the album jumped from number 24 to a new peak of number two on the Billboard 200 chart issue dated 1 March 2008 with sales of 115,000 copies. The album was certified double-Platinum by the Recording Industry Association of America (RIAA) on 12 March 2008, and has since sold nearly three million copies in the US.

Back to Black topped the European Top 100 Albums chart for 13 non-consecutive weeks, while reaching number one in several European countries such as Austria, Belgium, Germany, Greece, Ireland, and Switzerland. The album was certified eight-times Platinum by the International Federation of the Phonographic Industry (IFPI) in late 2011, denoting sales of eight million copies across Europe. By September 2018, the album had sold over 16 million copies worldwide.

Following Winehouse's death on 23 July 2011, sales of Back to Black drastically increased across the world. The album rose to number one on several iTunes charts worldwide. On 24 July 2011, with fewer than seven hours sales after the announcement of her death counting towards the respective week's chart figures, the album re-entered the UK Albums Chart at number 49 with 2,446 copies sold. The following week, it soared back to number one, marking the fourth time the album had reached the top of the chart. Back to Black held the top spot for two additional weeks. On 26 July 2011, Billboard reported that the album had re-entered the Billboard 200 chart dated 6 August 2011 at number nine with sales of 37,000 copies, although that week's chart only tracked the first 36 hours of sales after her death was announced. The following week, it climbed to number seven with 38,000 copies sold after a full week's worth of sales. In Canada, the album re-entered the Canadian Albums Chart at number 13 on sales of 2,500 copies. It rose to number six the following week, selling an additional 5,000 copies. In continental Europe, Back to Black returned to the number-one spot in Austria, Croatia, Germany, the Netherlands, Poland and Switzerland, while reaching number one for the first time in Italy.

Impact and legacy

After the release of Back to Black, record companies sought out more experimental female artists. Other female artists signed to major labels included Adele, Duffy, V V Brown, Florence and the Machine, La Roux and Little Boots. In the years after Back to Black was released, Dan Cairns of The Sunday Times noted that there was a "notion [by A&R executives, radio playlisters and the public] that women are the driving commercial force in pop". In March 2011, the New York Daily News ran an article attributing the continuing wave of British female artists that have been successful in the United States to Winehouse and her absence. Spin magazine music editor Charles Aaron was quoted as saying, "Amy Winehouse was the Nirvana moment for all these women [...] They can all be traced back to her in terms of attitude, musical styles or fashion." According to Keith Caulfield, chart manager for Billboard, "Because of Amy, or the lack thereof, the marketplace was able to get singers like Adele, Estelle and Duffy [...] Now those ladies have brought on the new ones, like Eliza Doolittle, Rumer and Ellie [Goulding]." Linda Barnard of The Toronto Star finds Winehouse to be amongst "the British women who claimed chart-topping ownership [...] with powerful voices" and that her "impressive" five Grammy wins for Back to Black put her at the "pinnacle of pop music". In 2020, Rolling Stone ranked the album at number 33 on its list of The 500 Greatest Albums of All Time. The album was also included in the book 1001 Albums You Must Hear Before You Die. In a retrospective review for Rolling Stone in 2010, Douglas Wolk gave the album four-and-a-half out of five stars and referred to it as "an unlikely marvel, a desperately sad and stirring record whose hooks and production (by Remi and Mark Ronson) are worthy of the soul hall-of-famers she namedrops—'Tears Dry on Their Own' is basically 'Ain't No Mountain High Enough' recast as self-recrimination". In a 2019 poll of music writers conducted by The Guardian, "Back to Black" placed first in a ranking of the best albums of the 21st Century.

Documentary
In September 2018, a documentary film based on Back to Black, titled Amy Winehouse: Back to Black, was released. It contains new interviews, as well as archival footage. It was made by Eagle Vision, produced by Gil Cang, and released on DVD on 2 November 2018. The film features interviews by producers Mark Ronson and Salaam Remi, who worked half and half on the album, along with the Dap-Kings, Remi's music team, Ronettes singer Ronnie Spector, and close friends of Winehouse, including Nick Shymansky, Juliette Ashby, and Dionne Bromfield. The film is accompanied by An Intimate Evening in London, footage of a show Winehouse gave at Riverside Studios in London in 2008.

Track listing

Notes
  signifies a remixer
 "Addicted" is only included on UK and Irish pressings of the standard album, while appearing as a bonus track on all deluxe editions of the album.

Sample credits
 "Tears Dry on Their Own" contains a sample interpolation of "Ain't No Mountain High Enough", written by Nickolas Ashford and Valerie Simpson.
 "He Can Only Hold Her" contains a sample interpolation of "(My Girl) She's a Fox", written by Richard and Robert Poindexter.

Personnel
Credits adapted from the liner notes of Back to Black.

Musicians

 Amy Winehouse – vocals ; guitar ; background vocals 
 Nick Movshon – bass guitar 
 Homer Steinweiss – drums 
 Thomas Brenneck – guitar 
 Binky Griptite – guitar 
 Victor Axelrod – piano ; Wurlitzer, claps 
 Dave Guy – trumpet 
 Neal Sugarman – tenor saxophone 
 Ian Hendrickson-Smith – baritone saxophone 
 Mark Ronson – claps ; band arrangements ; tambourine ; snaps 
 Vaughan Merrick – claps 
 Perry Montague-Mason – violin, orchestra leader 
 Chris Tombling – violin 
 Mark Berrow – violin 
 Warren Zielinski – violin 
 Liz Edwards – violin 
 Boguslaw Kostecki – violin 
 Peter Hanson – violin 
 Jonathan Rees – violin 
 Tom Pigott-Smith – violin 
 Everton Nelson – violin 
 Bruce White – viola 
 Jon Thorne – viola 
 Katie Wilkinson – viola 
 Rachel Bolt – viola 
 Anthony Pleeth – cello 
 Joely Koos – cello 
 John Heley – cello 
 Helen Tunstall – harp 
 Steve Sidwell – trumpet 
 Richard Edwards – tenor trombone 
 Andy Mackintosh – alto saxophone 
 Chris Davies – alto saxophone 
 Jamie Talbot – tenor saxophone 
 Mike Smith – tenor saxophone 
 Dave Bishop – baritone saxophone 
 Frank Ricotti – percussion 
 Gabriel Roth – band arrangements 
 Chris Elliott – orchestra arrangements, orchestra conducting 
 Isobel Griffiths – orchestra contractor 
 Salaam Remi – upright bass ; drums ; piano ; bass ; guitar 
 Vincent Henry – baritone saxophone, tenor saxophone ; guitar ; clarinet ; bass clarinet ; alto saxophone, flute, piano, celeste ; saxophone 
 Bruce Purse – bass trumpet, flugelhorn ; trumpet 
 Troy Auxilly-Wilson – drums ; tambourine 
 John Adams – Rhodes ; organ 
 P*Nut – original demo production 
 Sam Koppelman – percussion 
 Cochemea Gastelum – baritone saxophone 
 Zalon – background vocals 
 Ade – background vocals

Technical

 Mark Ronson – production ; recording 
 Tom Elmhirst – mixing 
 Matt Paul – mixing assistance ; recording 
 Salaam Remi – production 
 Franklin Socorro – recording 
 Gleyder "Gee" Disla – recording assistance 
 Shomari "Sho" Dillon – recording assistance 
 Gary "G Major" Noble – mixing 
 James Wisner – mixing assistance 
 Dom Morley – recording engineering assistance ; recording 
 Vaughan Merrick – recording 
 Jesse Gladstone – recording assistance 
 Mike Makowski – recording assistance 
 Gabriel Roth – recording 
 Derek Pacuk – recording 
 Stuart Hawkes – mastering

Artwork
 Mischa Richter – photography
 Harry Benson – centre page photography
 Alex Hutchinson – design

Charts

Weekly charts

Year-end charts

Decade-end charts

All-time charts

Certifications and sales

Release history

See also

 Amy Winehouse: Back to Black
 List of European number-one hits of 2008
 List of number-one albums of 2007 (Poland)
 List of number-one albums of 2008 (Ireland)
 List of number-one albums of 2008 (New Zealand)
 List of number-one albums of 2008 (Spain)
 List of number-one albums of 2011 (Poland)
 List of number-one hits of 2007 (France)
 List of number-one hits of 2008 (Austria)
 List of number-one hits of 2008 (Germany)
 List of number-one hits of 2011 (Austria)
 List of number-one hits of 2011 (Germany)
 List of number-one hits of 2011 (Italy)
 List of number-one hits of 2011 (Switzerland)
 List of UK Albums Chart number ones of the 2000s
 List of UK Albums Chart number ones of the 2010s
 List of best-selling albums by women
 List of best-selling albums in the United Kingdom

Notes

References

Bibliography

External links
 

2006 albums
Amy Winehouse albums
Albums produced by Mark Ronson
Albums produced by Salaam Remi
Albums recorded at Chung King Studios
Contemporary R&B albums by English artists
Grammy Award for Best Pop Vocal Album
Island Records albums
Universal Republic Records albums